This is the discography of English rock and roll singer Billy Fury.

Albums

Studio albums

Live albums

Soundtrack albums

Compilation albums

EPs

Singles

Notes

References 

Discographies of British artists
Rock music discographies